Levon may refer to:

Music
"Levon" (song), a song by Elton John and Bernie Taupin
Levon & the Hawks, an original alternative name for The Band
Love for Levon, a concert held on October 3, 2012 in New Jersey as a tribute to the late drummer/singer Levon Helm of The Band
Levon (band), a country music band

Other uses
Levon (name)

See also
Lavon (disambiguation)